KWJK (93.1 FM "Jack FM") is a radio station broadcasting an adult hits format. Licensed to Boonville, Missouri, US, the station serves the Columbia, Missouri, area. The station is currently owned by Billings Broadcasting LLC.

Station History

1999-2005: Adult Standards 
The station was originally owned by Big Country of Missouri, Inc., and was issued the KBHO call sign on July 17, 1998. The KWRT-FM call sign was assigned on June 14, 2000, and coincided with a format change to adult standards as "Casino 93.1."  Casino 93.1 was originally simulcast on then-sister station KWRT-AM, and featured the Jones Radio Network's "Music of Your Life" satellite feed.

2005-present: Adult Hits 
In October 2005, the station dropped adult standards in favor of the ABC Satellite Network's Jack FM feed. In January 2011, Billings Broadcasting LLC purchased KWJK.

The station airs a local talk show in the morning, The Tom Bradley Show. This is rare for a Jack FM station. The rest of the day runs without DJs.

References

External links

WJK
Radio stations established in 1998
Jack FM stations
Boonville, Missouri
Adult hits radio stations in the United States